Habanera (feminine form of the Spanish word habanero, "from Havana") may refer to:

Music 
Habanera or contradanza, a style of Cuban popular dance music of the 19th century
Habanera, a work for violin and piano by Pablo de Sarasate, part of the Spanish Dances
Habanera, a work for piano of 1885 by Emmanuel Chabrier, arranged for orchestra by him in 1888 
Habanera, composition for flute or violin & piano by Maurice Ravel
Habanera, composition for cello and piano by Ernesto Halffter
Habanera, guitar composition by Eduardo Sainz de la Maza
Habanera, guitar composition by Xavier Montsalvatge
"Habanera" (aria), popular name of an aria "L'amour est un oiseau rebelle" from Bizet's opera Carmen
Habanera (John Harle album), a 1987 album by the English classical saxophonist John Harle
Habanera, a 2000 album by Celia Cruz
Habanera, classical album by Elīna Garanča
Charanga Habanera, timba group
Quatuor Habanera, saxophone quartet
La Habanera, song on album One Second by pop group Yello

Film 
La Habanera (film), a 1937 German movie

Animals 
Soritena habanera, species of tiger moth
Volvarina habanera, sea snail

Other 
Havaner lebn or Vida Habanera, a Cuban-Yiddish newspaper

See also
Habanero (disambiguation)
Habano (disambiguation)